Sir James Henry Craig was launched at Quebec in 1811. She sailed to England and made three voyages as a West Indiaman. The British East India Company (EIC), in 1813 lost its monopoly on the trade between Britain and India. In 1817 she sailed for India but was condemned at Calcutta after she sustained extensive storm-damage at the start of her homeward-bound voyage.

Career
Sir James Henry Craig, Kippen, master, was cleared for London in November 1811. She then arrived at Deal, from Quebec. She was re-registered in London prior to 19 May 1812.

Sir James Henry Craig first appeared in Lloyd's Register (LR) for 1813 with Kippen, master, changing to Taylor, Linthorne, owner, changing to Dawson & Co., and trade London–Quebec, changing to London–Jamaica.

Lloyd's Register for 1815 listed her with A. Davidson, master, changing to M'Iver, J. Dawson, owner, and trade London–Jamaica. She had undergone repairs for damages in 1813 and 1814. In 1816 she was offered for sale or charter. The advertisement described her as having been built for the East India trade. She had only made three voyages to Jamaica, was copper-fastened and had been coppered in 1815. She had just come out of a dry dock.

Captain B. Browne, owner and master, sailed her from England on 30 March 1817, bound for Bombay, under a license from the EIC.

Fate
On 13 September 1817 Sir James Henry Craig, Brown, master, put back to Calcutta after sailing for London. She had endured 14 days of gales that had left leaking and with her mainmast and bowsprit sprung. It was expected that she would transship her cargo in October and that she would go into dock to be condemned. She was condemned on 14 November. She was then sold for breaking up.

Citations

References
 
 

1811 ships
Ships built in Quebec
Age of Sail merchant ships of England
Maritime incidents in 1817